James Edward Panther (born March 1, 1945) is an American former professional baseball player.

Panther spent his college career at Southern Illinois University Carbondale where he was a member of Sigma Pi fraternity. 

His career record in the major leagues was 7-13, with a 5.26 ERA.

References

Major League Baseball pitchers
Oakland Athletics players
Texas Rangers players
Atlanta Braves players
Gulf Coast Athletics players
Leesburg A's players
Peninsula Grays players
Southern Illinois Salukis baseball players
Birmingham A's players
Iowa Oaks players
Richmond Braves players
Baseball players from Iowa
1945 births
Living people
People from Burlington, Iowa